Cenarchis is a genus of moths in the family Oecophoridae. All species were described by Edward Meyrick in 1924 and are found in Rodrigues.

Species
Cenarchis capitolina Meyrick, 1924
Cenarchis celebrata Meyrick, 1924
Cenarchis liopsamma Meyrick, 1924
Cenarchis plectrophora Meyrick, 1924
Cenarchis priscata Meyrick, 1924
Cenarchis vesana Meyrick, 1924
Cenarchis veterata Meyrick, 1924

References
Markku Savela's ftp.funet.fi

Oecophoridae